Cydros leucurus is a species of beetle in the family Cerambycidae. It was described by Francis Polkinghorne Pascoe in 1866. It is known from Colombia, French Guiana and Panama.

References

Onciderini
Beetles described in 1866